Grand Casemates may refer to:
Grand Casemates, a former casemate and barracks in Gibraltar 
Grand Casemates Gates, a gate in the northern defensive wall of Gibraltar
Grand Casemates Square, a public square in Gibraltar